Rakotoarisoa is a Malagasy surname.

People
 Tisbite Rakotoarisoa (born 1951), Malagasy Olympic middle-distance runner
 Andrianirina Marie Bruno Rakotoarisoa, Malagasy politician
 Baggio Rakotoarisoa (born 1996), Malagasy international footballer

Malagasy-language surnames
Surnames of Malagasy origin